White City Speedway (Manchester) were a British motorcycle speedway team who operated between 1928 and 1930 and were based at White City Stadium (Manchester), Chester Road, Old Trafford, Greater Manchester, England.

Dirt track racing started on Saturday 16 June 1928 and finished in 1930 but was revived for a meeting in 1958.

Season summary

Notable riders

References

Defunct British speedway teams
History of sport in Manchester